Odysseas Spyridis (born 17 January 2001) is a Cypriot professional footballer who plays as a winger for Greek Super League 2 club PAOK B.

Career
Born in Volos, Greece, Spyridis moved to Cyprus whilst one month old. On the island, Spyridis played for Digenis Akritas Morphou, before moving to England in 2013, joining West Ham United. In May 2019, after six years at the club, West Ham confirmed Spyridis was one of four scholars to be released by the club. In September 2021, Spyridis signed for newly formed Greek club PAOK B.

Style of play
PAOK describe Spyridis as a left winger with "trickery and pace as his chief weapons" alongside "good technique and an appetite for hard work and further development".

References

2001 births
Living people
Footballers from Volos
Greek footballers
Cypriot footballers
Super League Greece 2 players
PAOK FC players
Association football midfielders
Greek expatriate footballers
Greek expatriate sportspeople in England
Cypriot expatriate footballers
Cypriot expatriate sportspeople in England
Digenis Akritas Morphou FC players
Expatriate footballers in England
PAOK FC B players